The anterior scrotal nerves are branches of the ilioinguinal nerve. The nerves innervates the scrotum in males.
The equivalent nerves in the female are the anterior labial nerves.

See also
 Posterior scrotal nerves

Nerves of the lower limb and lower torso
Scrotum